The R-5 Pobeda (Побе́да, "Victory") was a theatre ballistic missile developed by the Soviet Union during the Cold War. The R-5M version was assigned the NATO reporting name SS-3 Shyster and carried the GRAU index 8K51.

The R-5 was originally a development of OKB-1 as a single-stage missile with a detachable warhead reentry vehicle. The R-5M was a nuclear armed missile – the first nuclear missile to be deployed by the Soviet Union – with greater payload and weight but better reliability than its predecessor. The R-5M gave the Soviet Union the ability to target many strategic targets in Europe. The R-5M entered service on 21 May 1956 (retired in 1967), and in 1959 was installed at Vogelsang, Zehdenick and Fürstenberg/Havel in East Germany - the first Soviet nuclear missile bases outside the USSR.

By the end of 1956, 24 launchers were deployed, with a final total of 48 produced by the end of 1957; around 200 missiles were built. The R-5M was deployed in brigades of six launchers each or regiments of four launchers each. The basic field unit was a division, each having two batteries with a single launcher. Brigades and regiments had deployments in Kapustin Yar, Kaliningrad, East Germany (from January to September 1959), Volgograd Oblast, Lithuania, the Russian Far East, and Ukraine.

R-5 was additionally an oft-reported alternate designation for the K-5 (missile) air-to-air missile.

In 1958 R-5A rockets were used to launch pairs of dogs to altitudes up to 480km.

Specification
Propellant liquid
Range 
Period of storage after fueling: 1 hour
Time of preparation 2.5 hours
Guidance: inertial guidance plus radio command guidance
Warhead and Yield 60 \ 80 kt, 300 kt, 1 Mt (or more) thermonuclear warhead

Operators

 Soviet Army

See also
 List of missiles

References

External links

 Global Security: R-5 / SS-3 SHYSTER
 R-5
 page from FAS
 Encyclopedia Astronautica: R-5

R-005
Cold War ballistic missiles of the Soviet Union
Military equipment introduced in the 1950s